Richard Zulys (born April 5, 1984 in Toronto, Ontario) is a former Canadian football guard. He was drafted in the fifth round with the 37th overall pick in the 2008 CFL Draft by the Toronto Argonauts. He played CIS Football at Western Ontario University.

References

External links 
 Toronto Argonauts bio

1984 births
Living people
Canadian football offensive linemen
Players of Canadian football from Ontario
Canadian football people from Toronto
Toronto Argonauts players
Western Mustangs football players